Strophosomia is a severe form of congenital ventral fissure, all abdominal and thoracic viscera being free in the uterus.

It is an extreme case of celosomia.

In humans 
It is a very rare dysmorphic feature in humans.

In farm animals 
The condition occurs regularly in calves and lambs. The spine is flexed 180° so that the caudal region is near the neck, in so-called Schizosoma reflexum.

During the obstetrical operations, the viscera are reached first, but the four limbs fold backwards may be barely accessible.

Cesarian section is often required in cows. Fetotomy can resolve the condition in ewes.

References 

Animal developmental biology
Congenital disorders